Henryków may refer to the following places in Poland:
Henryków, Lower Silesian Voivodeship (south-west Poland)

Henryków, Kuyavian-Pomeranian Voivodeship (north-central Poland)
Henryków, Brzeziny County in Łódź Voivodeship (central Poland)
Henryków, Tomaszów Mazowiecki County in Łódź Voivodeship (central Poland)
Henryków, Zduńska Wola County in Łódź Voivodeship (central Poland)
Henryków, Świętokrzyskie Voivodeship (south-central Poland)
Henryków, Grójec County in Masovian Voivodeship (east-central Poland)
Henryków, Kozienice County in Masovian Voivodeship (east-central Poland)
Henryków, Sochaczew County in Masovian Voivodeship (east-central Poland)
Henryków, Greater Poland Voivodeship (west-central Poland)
Henryków, Lubusz Voivodeship (west Poland)
Henryków, a district of Warsaw

See also
Book of Henryków, a chronicle which contains the earliest known sentence written in Polish
Henryków Lubański
Henryków-Urocze
Stary Henryków